Denis Godwin Antoine is a Grenadian diplomat.

On  he was appointed Ambassador to Washington, D.C. where he was accredited on  he was concurrently accredited as Permanent Representative to the Organization of American States (OAS) and to Panama City and Mexico City.

On  he was appointed  Permanent Representative of Grenada to the United Nations in New York City where he was accredited on 

Publications 
Effective Diplomacy: A Practitioner's Guide, Xlibris Corporation, 2009 – 218 pp.,  (self-published)

References

Year of birth missing (living people)
Living people
Ambassadors of Grenada to the United States
Permanent Representatives of Grenada to the United Nations
Ambassadors of Grenada to China